Charles Hamilton, 5th Earl of Abercorn (died June 1701) succeeded his brother who had been attainted as a Jacobite and, having conformed to the established church, could get the attainder reversed.

Birth and origins 

Charles was born between 1659 and 1668, probably at Kenure House in Rush near Dublin. He was the second son of George Hamilton, and his wife Elizabeth Fagan. His father was the 4th Baron Hamilton of Strabane, an important landowner in County Tyrone. The Strabanes were a cadet branch of the Abercorns and like the latter of Scottish origin.

Charles's mother was a rich heiress, the only child of Christopher Fagan of Feltrim, County Dublin. Charles was one of four siblings, who are listed in his father's article.

His parents were both Catholic, but he later conformed to the established religion. The family's usual residence was Kenure House in Rush near Dublin, where he and his siblings were probably born and where his father died.

Brother's succession 
Charles's father died on 14 April 1668 at Kenure House and his elder brother, Claud, succeeded as the 5th Baron of Strabane. Charles became heir presumptive as his brother was unmarried. In about 1680 Claud also succeeded as the 4th Earl of Abercorn after the death of his cousin George in faraway Padua, Italy. This made him heir presumptive.

However, in August 1691, when Charles was about 26, Claud was killed in a sea-fight when a Dutch privateer attacked the ship that should have brought him from Limerick to France. His brother had been a Jacobite and had been attainted in Ireland on 11 May 1691. Charles succeeded him immediately as the 5th Earl of Abercorn as the family's Scottish titles were not affected by the attainder but could not become Baron Hamilton of Strabane as the title was forfeit.

Abercorn, as he was now, had supported the Prince of Orange and was a Protestant, perhaps due to his marriage. On 24 May 1692, he obtained a reversal of his brother's attainder and also succeeded as Baron Hamilton of Strabane, becoming the 6th holder of that title. In that capacity he took his seat in the Irish House of Lords on 31 August 1695.

Marriage and children 
About 1690 Abercorn married Catherine Lenthall (née Hamilton), the widow of William Lenthall of Burford, a grandson of the speaker, and the daughter of James Hamilton, Lord Paisley. She was his second cousin, the common great-grandfather being James Hamilton, 1st Earl of Abercorn. Her father had converted to the Church of Scotland and she was a Protestant as her father and her first husband had been.

 
Charles and Catherine had one daughter:
Elizabeth, died young and was buried in St. Michan's Church, Dublin on 22 February 1699

In 1697 Abercorn signed the Association, an oath of loyalty to the King William and Queen Mary that had been introduced in reaction to the Jacobite assassination plot of 1696.

On 3 April 1697 John Pryor was found murdered in the garden of the priory of Burford. He had been a steward to William Lenthall, Abercorn's wife's first husband. Abercorn was accused of the murder and jailed but was finally acquitted.

Death, succession, and timeline 
Abercorn died childless in Strabane in June 1701. His only child, Elizabeth, had predeceased him in 1699. His widow died on 24 May 1723 in Pall Mall, London, and was buried in the Richmond vault of the Henry VII Chapel at Westminster Abbey.

With his death, the senior line of the Abercorns and the Strabanes failed. With regard to the Abercorns, the succession reverted to the next of the cadet branches descending from the five sons of the 1st Earl of Abercorn as it already had done in about 1650 when George, the 3rd Earl, died unmarried in Padua. As the 1st Earl's third son, William, 1st Baronet of Westport, had no children, the succession passed to the descendants of the fourth son, Sir George Hamilton, 1st Baronet, of Donalong. Our subject, the 5th Earl, was therefore succeeded as Earl of Abercorn by his second cousin, James Hamilton, the grandson of Sir George. James Hamilton would thus become the 6th Earl of Abercorn.

With regard to the Strabanes, Charles, our subject, was the 6th Baron, and the last heir-male of Claud Hamilton, the 2nd Baron, to whom the title was regranted after the 2nd Earl had resigned it. The succession, therefore, needed to make use of the special remainder, which also allowed succession through heirs-male from the body of the grantee's father. Therefore, not only the Scottish but also the Irish title devolved to his second cousin, James Hamilton. James, therefore, became 6th Earl of Abercorn and 7th Baron Hamilton of Strabane. From that time on these two titles merged and would always be worn by the same person.

Notes and references

Notes

Citations

Sources 

  – Marriages, baptisms and burials from about 1660 to 1875
  – Ab-Adam to Basing
 
  – (for timeline)
 
  – Viscounts
 
  – Abercorn to Balmerino

 

 

1660s births
1701 deaths
05
Charles
Members of the Irish House of Lords